The Hotel class is the general NATO classification for a type of nuclear-powered ballistic missile submarine that was launched by the Soviet Union around 1959. The Soviet designation was Project 658.

Design
The development of the submarine, designed to carry the D-2 launch system and R-13 missiles, was approved on 26 August 1956. Work on the design began in September 1956, the technical project was completed in the first quarter of 1957.

The duties of the chief designer of Project 658 were originally assigned to the chief engineer of OKB-18, P.Z. Golosovskiy. In February 1958 project management was transferred to I.V. Mikhaylov, who in October 1958 had replaced S.N. Kovalev. From the outset the deputy of the chief designer was I.D. Spasskiy.

The Hotel design was based on the Project 627 , the first Soviet nuclear submarines. They were modified by adding the missile compartment from the s. Additionally, the Hotels had small horizontal hydroplanes for better maneuverability and more reliable electro-hydraulic command control surfaces for high-speed underwater operations with reduced noise.

The D-2 launch system on the Hotels placed three R-13 missiles in vertical containers directly behind the sail. The submarine had to be surfaced to launch, but all three missiles could be fired within 12 minutes of surfacing.

Variants

Hotel I
The first Hotel-class submarine, was laid down on 17 October 1958 and commissioned on 12 November 1960, only to suffer numerous setbacks and accidents. The last of the eight Hotel submarines was launched on April 1st, 1962. All of them were built at Severodvinsk State Shipyard 402 (now known as the Northern Machine-Building Enterprise - SEVMASH) in Molotovsk (now Severodvinsk) shipyard Russia.

Hotel II
The modified submarines received the NATO reporting name Hotel II. The installation of the D-4 launching system required some structural changes of the submarine; before launch, the launch tube had to be flooded. The chief designer of the modification was S.N. Kovalev.

Hotel III
From 1969 to 1970, K-145 was modified by Project 701 to test the R-29 missiles, receiving the NATO reporting name Hotel III. It was lengthened to 130 meters and its displacement increased to 5,500 tons surfaced and 6,400 tons submerged. Six launchers for R-29 missiles were placed in two compartments, each with three launchers. In 1976 K-145 returned to combat service.

Vessels

Notes

References
Page in Russian Language
Page in English from FAS
Hotel Class Submarines - Complete Ship List (English)
The Encyclopedia Of Warships, From World War Two To The Present Day, General Editor Robert Jackson.

Submarine classes
 
Russian and Soviet navy submarine classes
Nuclear-powered submarines
Ships built by Sevmash